John Fred Gourrier (May 8, 1941 – April 15, 2005), known by his stage name John Fred, was an American blue-eyed soul, swamp pop, rock and roll, and R&B performer from Baton Rouge, Louisiana, best known for the 1967 hit song "Judy in Disguise (With Glasses)".

Early life
John Fred was born on May 8, 1941 in Baton Rouge, Louisiana, the son of John Fred Gourrier Sr. and Miriam Chaisson. He had two sisters: Ann Gourrier Kleinpeter and Kay Gourrier Begue.

Career
His group, John Fred and the Playboys, was formed in 1956 when Fred was 15; their first charting single was March 1959's "Shirley". He appeared on Alan Freed's show, but when Dick Clark asked him to sing on American Bandstand, Fred had to turn him down because he had to play in a basketball game. Fred played basketball and baseball at Louisiana State University and Southeastern Louisiana University.

By 1967, the band was renamed John Fred & His Playboy Band – to avoid confusion with Gary Lewis & the Playboys – and Fred and band member Andrew Bernard co-wrote "Judy in Disguise (With Glasses)", whose name is a parodic play on the title of The Beatles' song "Lucy in the Sky with Diamonds". The song, issued by Louisiana-based Jewel Records on the Paula label, became successful, knocking "Hello, Goodbye", another Beatles song, out of the No. 1 chart position on the Billboard Hot 100 for two weeks in January 1968. It sold over one million copies, and was awarded a gold disc. With the success of the single, John Fred & His Playboy Band was branded as a novelty act and never had another major success. The follow-up single, "Hey, Hey, Bunny", peaked at No. 57 on the Billboard chart, and the band never again hit the Hot 100. Only after years of struggles did Fred obtain full legal rights to "Judy in Disguise" and its royalties.

Later life and death
Fred continued to perform in bands, coached high school basketball and baseball, and remained a fixture at concerts and shows in his hometown. He produced records for other artists, including Irma Thomas and Fats Domino, and hosted a popular local radio show, The Roots of Rock 'n' Roll, at WBRH in Baton Rouge. He released several solo albums and one group effort, Louisiana Boys, with Joe Stampley and G. G. Shinn. He also wrote and produced radio commercials and jingles, earning two Clio Awards.

In 2004, Fred's health began to fail. Complications ensued after he received a kidney transplant, which culminated in a long hospital stay in New Orleans. He died on April 15, 2005, at the age of 63, survived by his wife, Sandra; a son, Kevin; Kevin's wife, Jodi; and a grandson, Jon Sterling Gourrier.

Awards
in 1999, he received the Louisiana Hall of Fame Living Legend Award, and in 2007 was the first artist inducted into the Louisiana Music Hall of Fame. Later, he was appointed to serve on the Louisiana Music Commission. He was also inducted into the Louisiana Blues Hall of Fame  and the Delta Music Hall of Fame.

Discography

Albums
John Fred and His Playboys (Paula LPS-2191), 1966
34:40 of John Fred and His Playboys (Paula LPS-2193), 1967
Agnes English (Paula LPS-2197), 1967
Judy in Disguise (Paula LPS-2197), 1967
Permanently Stated (Paula LPS-2201), 1969
Love My Soul (Uni 73077), 1970
Juke Box (Guinness GNS 36022), 1977
Louisiana Boys (Bayou Music BM9301-2), 1993 (as the Louisiana Boys)
I Miss Ya'll (The Unreleased Masters) (Club Louisianne CDCL 2001), 1999
Somebody's Knockin''' (TJ Records TJ0102), 2002Roots Rockin' Blues (CD Baby B01HQEGS8A), 2016 (as the Louisiana Riverfront Band)

CompilationsThe Best of John Fred and the Playboys (Sugarcane Records SR-100), 1984The History of John Fred and the Playboys (Paula PCD-9000), 1991John Fred & His Playboy Band – Anthologie 1958/1969 (Magic 3930818), 2008, France … With Glasses – The Very Best of John Fred and His Playboy Band: The Jewel and Paula Recordings 1964-69 (Fuel 2000 – 3020617562), 2009Judy in Disguise with Glasses (Liberation Hall 5071), 2022

AppearancesThe Golden Age Of American Rock 'n' Roll Volume 6 (Ace CDCHD 650), 1997, UK – "Shirley"Swamp Pop by the Bayou: Troubles, Tears & Trains (Ace CDCHD 1462), 2016, UK – "You Know You Made Me Cry", "Shirley"Swamp Pop: The Best of Bayou Country (Apple Music), 2022 – "Good Lovin'"East Coast Teen Party'' (East Coast Music – ECM CD333) – "Boogie Children", "Shirley"

Singles

Discography notes

References

External links
John Fred & His Playboy Band at tsimon.com
Horn Rock Heaven at myspace.com

John Fred & His Playboy Band at 64 Parishes.com
John Fred & His Playboy Band at spectropop.com

1941 births
2005 deaths
American pop musicians
Swamp pop music
Jewel Records artists
Musicians from Baton Rouge, Louisiana
Musicians from New Orleans
20th-century American musicians
Kidney transplant recipients